The Eurobowl was the championship final game of a tournament style playoff to determine the champion of all of the American football leagues in Europe. The tournament featured the top or champion clubs from each countries top league that was called the European Football League (EFL). The first Eurobowl final was played in 1986 in Amsterdam.

After 2014, it was known as the BIG6 European Football League (BIG6). Before 2014, the Eurobowl was the final championship game of the European Football League.

The last BIG6 was played in 2018. The last Eurobowl was played on 8 June 2019 without any playoff league competition prior to the game. The Potsdam Royals beat the Amsterdam Crusaders 62–12.

With six titles the New Yorker Lions from Braunschweig are the leading team in Eurobowl wins. The Vienna Vikings have the most appearances at 10, and winning five Eurobowl championship finals.

Roster

Every team in the European Football League had to publish its 60-man roster. After that no player can be added. Every game day the teams have to nominated an EFAF active game day roster, which is limited to 45 players with a maximum of 3 active Americans as defined USA, Canadian, Mexican or Japanese passport holders. These three players may all be on the field at the same time.

Eurobowls

Champions

by team

 † Known as Braunschweig Lions before 2011.

by country

References

External links

European Football League
American football bowls in Europe
1986 establishments in Europe
Recurring sporting events established in 1986